Andy Roddick was the defending champion but lost in the semifinals to James Blake.

Lleyton Hewitt won in the final 6–4, 6–4 against Blake.

Seeds
The top eight seeds receive a bye into the second round.

Draw

Finals

Top half

Section 1

Section 2

Bottom half

Section 3

Section 4

References 
 2006 Queen's Club Championships Draw
 2006 Queen's Club Championships Qualifying Draw

Singles